Daejong of Goryeo (died 969; born Wang Uk) was a Goryeo Royal Prince as the only son of King Taejo and Queen Sinjeong, elder brother of Queen Daemok and father of King Seongjong. Through his children, he became the grandfather of Queen Wonyong and maternal grandfather to both Mokjong and Hyeonjong.

He married his half younger sister and had 3 sons and 3 daughters. However, both of them died in 969 and their young children were raised by his mother. After Gyeongjong's death, Uk's second son, Wang Chi, ascended the throne as Seongjong and then gave posthumous name and temple name to his late parent. He and his wife were buried in Taereung Tomb (태릉, 泰陵).

Family 
Parents
Father: Taejo of Goryeo (31 January 877 – 4 July 943), personal name Wang Geon (왕건)
Mother: Queen Sinjeong of the Hwangju Hwangbo clan (신정왕후 황보씨, d.19 August 983)
Consorts and their respective issue(e):
Queen Seonui of the Jeongju Ryu clan (선의왕후 류씨), his half-sister
Crown Prince Hyodeok (효덕태자), first son
Seongjong of Goryeo (고려성종,15 January 961 – 29 November 997), second son 
Prince Gyeongjang (경장태자), third son 
Unnames princess, first daughter 
Queen Heonjeong of the Hwangju Hwangbo clan (헌정왕후 황보씨; d. 993), third daughter 
Queen Heonae of the Hwangju Hwangbo clan ( 헌애왕후 황보씨; 964 – 20 January 1029), second daughter

Posthumous name
In April 1002 (5th year reign of King Mokjong), name Hwa-gan (화간, 和簡) was added. 
In March 1014 (5th year reign of King Hyeonjong), name Gong-sin (공신, 恭愼) was added.
In April 1027 (18th year reign of King Hyeonjong), name Hyeon-heon (현헌, 顯獻) was added to his Posthumous name.

In popular culture
Portrayed by Jung Gook-jin in the 2002–2003 KBS TV series The Dawn of the Empire.
Portrayed by Im Joo-hwan in the 2015 MBC TV series Shine or Go Crazy.
Portrayed by Kang Ha-neul in the 2016 SBS TV Series Moon Lovers: Scarlet Heart Ryeo.

References

Citations

Books

External links
고려 대종 on Encykorea .
고려 대종 on Doosan Encyclopedia .

Year of birth unknown
10th-century births
Anti-kings
969 deaths
10th-century Korean monarchs